Renè Cinquin (1898–1978) was a creator of panoramic maps in the United States. He also painted. Several of his maps are in the Library of Congress' collection. Metropolitan Aero-View Co. was a publisher of his maps.

The firm of Hughes & Cinquin produced panoramic maps during the 1920s under the sponsorship of Oakley H. Bailey (1843-1947), a panoramic map artist and publisher. The panoramic map collection of the Library of Congress has seven Aero-View maps of Long Island towns and six of New Jersey towns drawn by Rene Cinquin between 1924 and 1929. Most were published by either Hughes & Cinquin, Brooklyn, or Metropolitan Aero-View Co., New York.

Cinquin's map of Patchogue includes an extensive writeup about the community.

Gallery

References

20th-century American artists
20th-century cartographers
1898 births
1978 deaths
Panoramic art
Place of birth missing